The following table is a list of South African universities by endowment size.

Public universities
The following are the South African universities with the largest financial endowments, expressed in South African Rands at fair value. A financial endowment is a transfer of money and/or property donated to an institution and the total value of an institution's investments is often referred to as the institution's endowment. All sources are official audited financial statements published in the respective fiscal years. For this list, short scale billions (thousand of millions) are used.

See also 
 List of universities in South Africa
 Lists of institutions of higher education by endowment size

References
 

List
Universities by endowment
South Africa
South Africa